The 1980–81 Wisconsin Badgers men's basketball team represented the University of Wisconsin–Madison in the 1980–81 NCAA Division I men's basketball season. The head coach was Bill Cofield, coaching his 5th season with the Badgers. The team played their home games at the UW Fieldhouse in Madison, Wisconsin and was a member of the Big Ten Conference.

Forward Claude Gregory was the team's leading scorer with 20.4 points and 9.2 rebounds in 27 games. Other statistical leaders included guard Danny Hastings with 3.1 assists.

Roster

Schedule

Team players drafted into the NBA

References 

Wisconsin
Wisconsin Badgers men's basketball seasons
Badge
Badge